Angara is a surname. Notable people with the surname include:

 Arthur Angara (born 1937), Filipino politician and mayor
 Bella Angara (born 1939), Filipino politician who has served as a governor of Aurora and as a member of the House of Representatives
 Edgardo Angara (1934–2018), Filipino politician who has served as a senator
 Joseph Angara (born 1971), Kenyan cricketer and coach
 Karen G. Angara (born 1973), Filipino politician and mayor
 Michael Angara, Papua New Guinean rugby player
 Rommel N. Angara (born 1980), Filipino poet
 Rommel T. Angara (born 1978), Filipino politician
 Sonny Angara (born 1972), Filipino politician and senator

Surnames of Philippine origin